Albany Hill is a prominent hill along the east shore of San Francisco Bay in the city of Albany, California. Geologically, the hill is predominantly Jurassic sandstone, carried to the western edge of North America on the Pacific Plate and scraped off there in the course of subduction. Albany Hill is part of a range of hills uplifted long before today's Berkeley Hills. These hills include Fleming Point and Point Isabel (their summits dynamited away), Brooks Island, the Potrero San Pablo, and the hills across San Pablo Strait.

Albany Hill's indigenous Ohlone name is unknown.  The 1772 Fages expedition referred to the landmark as "El Cerrito," and it was named Cerrito de San Antonio by the Luís María Peralta family after the name of their ranch, Rancho San Antonio, a Spanish land grant which encompassed much of the East Bay.  The name was changed to Albany Hill shortly after the city incorporated as Ocean View changed its name to Albany in 1909.  The adjacent city of El Cerrito was named after the hill's original Spanish name.

Early history

The north side of Albany Hill was long used by Native Americans, as evidenced by large mortar stones and remnants of a shell midden. Oaks on the north side, the willow grove where tributary Middle Creek joins Cerrito Creek, salt and fresh wetlands to the north (now filled), and the nearby Bay would have made this a bountiful seasonal home.

Beginning in the late 19th century, Judson Powder Works manufactured dynamite at the northwest foot of the hill. The company had been forced to move from San Francisco and then nearby Fleming Point in Berkeley because of continuing accidental explosions. The eucalyptus trees now on the hill were planted by the dynamite manufacturers to catch debris and muffle sound of these explosions. The stop on the transcontinental railroad tracks just to the west was called Nobel Station, after the inventor of dynamite.

In 1905, a massive accidental explosion of nitroglycerin killed 23 workers. The explosion carved a massive crater in the north flank of the hill, which is today evident by a large dip in the tree-line. After this incident, dynamite making was forced north to less-settled areas, making an eventual last stand at Pt. Pinole, now a regional park. Quarrying on the hill continued for many years, leaving scars on the rock and eventually obliterating a low summit northwest of Albany Hill, approximately where Richmond's Pacific East Mall is now located.

Modern history and ecology
As a large open space, the only nearby high elevation next to the Bay, and in the path of sea winds blowing through the Golden Gate, Albany Hill is an ecological island. It is a haven for plants normally found in much cooler areas, for example Nootka rose (Rosa nutkana), stinging phacelia (Phacelia malvifolia), and coast horkelia (Horkelia californica ssp. californica) The Native American practice of regular burning to avoid brush buildup (and major fires) was continued by the dynamite companies and later the city, into the 1960s. Perhaps as a result, the hill harbors unusually large numbers of native wildflowers and other plants. The oak forest on the cool north face remains much as it was pre-European-settlement. The non-native eucalyptus trees on the summit attract migrating and wintering monarch butterflies. Hawks, owls, wild turkeys, and deer are among the animal inhabitants; herons, kingfishers, and egrets fish the creek.

The hill provides a view of Albany, Berkeley — notably, UC Berkeley's Sather Tower — and the Berkeley Hills from one side. From the other, it looks out onto the Bay, with San Francisco in the distance.  Looking south from the hill, the high-rises in downtown Oakland and Emeryville are visible. From earliest European settlement, residents have enjoyed open space on the hill, "sledding" on dry grass and swinging from rope swings.

From the early 20th century on, particularly in the 1970s, numerous schemes were proposed for development of Albany Hill, from dynamiting it for bay fill to building high-rise hotels or blasting out the top as a reservoir. Protest by local residents defeated most of these. Eventually the city retained an environmental consultant to prepare an Environmental Impact Report on alternative development schemes and development densities. After a series of public hearings the consultant's recommendation design was chosen leading to the present development pattern of clustered high-rise residential use and preservation of the majority of the hill.

In 1994, citizens passed Measure K, cutting allowed density on the hill by half and allowing the city to pursue further lowering, and in 1996 voters passed Measure R, a special levy including $3 million to buy land on the hill. In 2008, the remaining open space hill was declared a Priority Conservation Area by Bay Area and state agencies. By 2019, when the bonds matured, the city had bought small parcels totaling six acres. The remaining bond funds in 2019 were being spent for access and other improvements called for in the city's plans for the park, adopted first in 1991 and repeated in a new plan adopted in 2012.

Just under  of almost 40 acres of open space on the hill is protected from development. A public park extends from Cerrito Creek up the north side of the hill. Large condominiums on the west side of the hill maintain significant areas of open space as part of their development agreements, and the north part of the summit ridge and a portion of the northeast slope is owned by the city.

The remaining quarter of the open space is a single tract: South of the highest point, a 10.7-acre privately owned parcel runs from Pierce Street on the west up over the summit and down to Taft Street on the east slope. Most users treat this land as park, but the city has never negotiated a legal right-of-way allowing public access. In late 2019, this tract was listed for sale at $10 million. It is zoned for apartments or town homes, with a maximum density of nine units per acre. The city's Master Plan includes various policies regarding this parcel, including keeping the summit open, clustering development, providing a trail easement, protecting monarch butterfly habitat, minimizing grading, and protecting and restoring the hill's natural features, native vegetation, and wildlife.

Fire is a serious concern on this wooded hill surrounded by city. Plans adopted in 1991 and 2012 call for thinning eucalyptus and controlling brush to create a savannah-like habitat that would limit fires. On November 15, 2008, strong dry northeast winds whipped up a fire in a forested area on the west side of the hill above a large apartment complex (555 Pierce Street).

However, the fire danger may be less than what it seems. In the 1980s, a large fire started from Pierce street, and swept uphill, going north-west. No large tree burned, although many were scorched. The fire burned fiercely the Poison Oak, next to the ground (this was witnessed by local residents such as Constance Ramos and Patrice Ayme). 
The city has increased brush control, road maintenance, and clearing. Clearing is limited by wanting to maintain habitat for birds, including hawks and owls, and monarch butterflies that use the eucalyptus trees as a migration stopover or winter habitat.

A few volunteer groups work on and near the hill. Friends of Albany Hill has worked to maintain and increase native vegetation on the hill itself by removing non-native invasive plants. The Friends have also educated the public about the natural and cultural significance of the hill, monitor the wintering site for the monarch butterfly migration and trail improvement projects, and in the 1990s they helped bring privately held parcels into city hands. Friends of Five Creeks has done extensive restoration along Cerrito and Middle Creeks and adjoining groves and meadows at the foot of the hill. A new group,TASH (Tending the Ancient Shoreline Hill), formed in 2018 to continue habitat restoration and environmental education on Albany Hill, holds monthly work parties.

Lions Club cross
A 20-foot cross stands near the summit of Albany Hill.  The cross was erected by the Albany Lions Club in 1971 on then-private land, subject to an easement allowing for maintenance by the Lions Club.  The land was obtained by the City of Albany in 1973.  The cross is illuminated by the Lions Club on Christmas, Easter, and other occasions such as the anniversary of the September 11 attacks.

The cross has been subject to disputes regarding the Lions Club easement and the legality of a Christian symbol displayed on public land.  In 2016, the city cut off power to the cross for several months, citing safety concerns regarding the electrical wiring.  In June 2018, a federal judge ruled the display unconstitutional, requiring that the city remove the cross or sell the parcel on which it stands.

Proposed Development of the West Side of the Hill
In January 2020, a development of 48 mansions up the west side of Albany Hill, facing the Golden Gate, was proposed by Trumark Homes. A public petition ("Save Albany Hill Park") was created online to entice City Hall to block the project.

Albany Hill Fire
On June 26, 2022, a vegetation fire broke out on the west side on Albany Hill, burning near Cleveland and Washington avenues. The City of Albany asked residents of Gateview, Hillside, and Taft St to evacuate. An initial evacuation center was set at Golden Gate Fields.

See also
Sala House

References

Hills of California
Albany, California
El Cerrito, California
Landforms of Contra Costa County, California
Landforms of the San Francisco Bay Area
Landmarks in the San Francisco Bay Area